Edmund Charles Somerset Webber (12 March 1894 – 26 August 1966) was an Australian rules footballer who played with Geelong in the Victorian Football League (VFL).

Notes

External links 

1894 births
1966 deaths
Australian rules footballers from Victoria (Australia)
Geelong Football Club players
Chilwell Football Club players
Australian military personnel of World War I
People educated at Geelong College